Piret Hartman (born 10 August 1981) is an Estonian politician. She serves as Minister of Culture in the second cabinet of Prime Minister Kaja Kallas.

References 

Living people
1981 births
Government ministers of Estonia
Women government ministers of Estonia
Social Democratic Party (Estonia) politicians
21st-century Estonian politicians
21st-century Estonian women politicians
Estonian University of Life Sciences alumni
Tallinn University of Technology alumni
People from Püssi